The Wilkinsons, a Canadian country music trio, released four studio albums, one compilation album, and 20 singles.

Studio albums

Compilation albums

Singles

Music videos

Notes

A^ "1999" reached number 16 on the Canadian RPM Country Singles chart when RPM ceased publication.

References

Country music discographies
Discographies of Canadian artists